Glyn Thomas (9 December 1882 – 1 February 1967) was an  Australian rules footballer who played with St Kilda in the Victorian Football League (VFL).

Notes

External links 

1882 births
1967 deaths
Australian rules footballers from Victoria (Australia)
St Kilda Football Club players
Ballarat Imperial Football Club players